Jörg-Dieter Ludwig was an East German luger who competed in the early 1980s. He won the silver medal in the men's doubles event at the 1981 FIL World Luge Championships in Hammarstrand, Sweden.

Ludwig also won two medals in the men's doubles event at the FIL European Luge Championships with a gold in 1979 and a silver in 1982.

References

German male lugers
Living people
Year of birth missing (living people)